Serious Business may refer to

 Serious Business (album), by Johnny Winter, released in 1985
 "Serious Business", a song from the album Uh-huh by John Cougar Mellencamp and the B-side of "Pink Houses"
 Serious Business, one of the earliest game developers on Facebook, acquired by Zynga in  2010
 Serious Business Records, a record label founded by Travis Harrison and Andy Ross

See also 
 SIRIUS Business, a commercial background music service of Applied Media Technologies Corporation